Louis J. Fellenz Jr. (March 27, 1915 – January 7, 1993) was a member of the Wisconsin State Senate.

Biography
Fellenz was born Louis John Fellenz Jr. on March 27, 1915, in Fond du Lac, Wisconsin. On June 1, 1941, Fellenz married Virginia Skinner in Green Lake, Wisconsin. He died on January 7, 1993, in Tryon, North Carolina.

His father, L. J. Fellenz, was also a member of the Senate.

Career
Fellenz was a member of the Senate representing the 18th district from 1941 to 1948. He was a Republican.

References

Politicians from Fond du Lac, Wisconsin
Republican Party Wisconsin state senators
1915 births
1993 deaths
20th-century American politicians